Halifax is a town in the metropolitan borough of Calderdale, West Yorkshire, England. It contains 254 listed buildings that are recorded in the National Heritage List for England. Of these, three are listed at Grade I, the highest of the three grades, 31 are at Grade II*, the middle grade, and the others are at Grade II, the lowest grade. The main industry of the town has been its cloth trade, which dates back to the 14th century, and grew particularly during the 19th century when the town increased considerably in size and prosperity. Of the listed buildings, there are relatively few dating from before the middle of the 18th century, with the great majority dating from between about 1825 and the end of the 19th century. There are many survivors from the cloth industry, especially mills that have been converted for other uses, particularly in the area of Dean Clough. A number of these former mills and associated structures are listed.

Some of the industrialists became very wealthy and used their wealth for philanthropic purposes, including creating buildings that have been listed, in particular Joseph and Francis Crossley and Edward Akroyd. The Crossley brothers each built a set of almshouses, Francis Crossley gave to the town the People's Park, which contains several listed buildings, and Edward Akroyd built the model village of Akroydon, most of which is listed, together with its church by G. G. Scott.

Of the other listed buildings, most are houses and associated structures, shops and markets, offices and banks, civic buildings, such as the Town Hall, public houses and hotels, schools, churches and chapels. The River Calder and the Calder and Hebble Navigation, with its Halifax Branch, run through the area, and listed buildings associated with these are bridges, locks, an aqueduct, and a lock keeper's house. Listed buildings associated with the railway are the Halifax railway station, a signal box, viaducts, bridges, a series of coal drops, an engine shed, and the portal to a tunnel. Other listed buildings include the remains of Halifax Gibbet, Piece Hall, a former cloth hall converted for other uses, warehouses, a former toll house, a cantilevered footpath and a weir, theatres and a former cinema, a drinking fountain, a former hospital, and statues and memorials, including a war memorial.


Key

Buildings

References

Citations

Sources

Lists of listed buildings in West Yorkshire
 Listed